= National Youth Arts Festival =

The National Youth Arts Festival was the United Kingdom's leading participatory non-competitive arts event for young people. In 1995 over 1500 young people took part, involving 56 groups from all over the UK. Throughout the 1990s the events were held in the North Devon town of Ilfracombe. It was preceded by the Channel Arts Youth Festival, a popular international cultural event in the 1980s. The event included contributions from theatre groups nationwide, as well as Dutch clog dancing and African Tribal Dancing.
